Liber de orbe was a Latin translation made in 1130s CE of an Arabic work attributed to the 8th century astrologer Mashallah ibn Athari. 

The work's main topic is cosmology and is considered one of the earliest works on Aristotelian physics available in Latin.

See also
 Astrology in medieval Islam

References

Astrological works of the medieval Islamic world
Natural philosophy
12th-century Latin books
Philosophical literature of the medieval Islamic world